Tambovka is a rural locality (a selo) and the administrative center of Tambovsky Selsoviet, Kharabalinsky District, Astrakhan Oblast, Russia. The population was 2,431 as of 2010. There are 31 streets.

Geography 
Tambovka is located on the Ashuluk River, 16 km southeast of Kharabali (the district's administrative centre) by road. Ashulukh is the nearest rural locality.

References 

Rural localities in Kharabalinsky District